{{Infobox boxer
|name=Mike McTigue
|realname=Michael Francis McTigue
|nickname=Bold Mike
|image=Mike McTigue.jpg
|weight=Light Heavyweight
|nationality=Irish British 
|birth_date=
|death_date=
|birth_place=Kilnamona, County Clare, 

"Bold" Mike McTigue (November 26, 1892 – August 12, 1966) was the light heavyweight boxing champion of the world from 1923 to 1925.

Early years

Michael Francis McTigue (Mike McTigue) was born in Lickaun, Kilnamona, in County Clare, Ireland, on 26 November 1892. He was recorded in the 1901 Census of County Clare.
McTigue emigrated to America in 1912 when he was 21.
He traveled as a steerage passenger of the British steamer Baltic, which arrived at the Port of New York on 21 September 1912. He was the brother of fellow boxer Jim McTigue.

Boxing career

World light heavyweight champion
McTigue began boxing and fought in America for 13 years. McTigue got a shot at the World Light Heavyweight Championship in 1923. Despite the Irish Civil War still ongoing, the fight was held in La Scala Opera House in Prince's Street, Dublin against the Senagalese Fighter Battling Siki. McTigue won on points after 20 rounds to become the World Light Heavyweight Champion.
He would defend his title against future Hall of Famers Tommy Loughran, Young Stribling and Mickey Walker before losing the title by unanimous decision to the gold medalist wrestler-turned-boxer Paul Berlenbach in 1925.

After his scheduled bout for August 11, 1927 versus reigning undisputed NBA, NYSAC and The Ring light heavyweight champion, Jack Delaney was cancelled due to Delaney vacating his titles and moving up to the heavyweight division, on July 26, 1927, the New York Athletic State Commission awarded McTigue their light heavyweight championship. McTigue lost his title in his first defense of the NYSAC light heavyweight title to Tommy Loughran on October 7, 1927.

Noteworthy opposition
McTigue fought multiple bouts in his career against the likes of Paul Berlenbach, Jeff Smith, Harry Greb, Mickey Walker and Tommy Loughran. He lost most of those bouts, but he actually got the best of the great Loughran during one of their no-decision contests. He also earned a close decision over Tiger Flowers. In 1927, he produced his greatest performance on American soil when he knocked out the great Berlenbach in the fourth round.

Retirement years and death

He was 38 years old when his boxing licence was revoked and had been fighting for 21 years. After his enforced retirement, McTigue ran a successful bar on Long Island until the late 1940s. He succumbed to poverty and ill health and was confined to various hospitals around New York for the last ten years of his life.  He finally died at New York's Queen's General Hospital on August 12, 1966.  He was survived by his widow and two daughters.

In later years McTigue regaled listeners with tales of the highlight of his career, particularly the Dublin bout. McTigue's favourite story involved an armed sentry stationed in his corner to keep the peace. As the rounds progressed, he stuck his bayonet between the ropes and jabbed McTigue in the leg. "I got three pounds' bet on you," the guard said. "God help you if you lose!" McTigue was honoured in his native parish when the porch of the church was named after him. Kilnamona's Community Centre was opened in 2001 and named in his honour.

Professional boxing record
All information in this section is derived from BoxRec, unless otherwise stated.

Official record

All newspaper decisions are officially regarded as “no decision” bouts and are not counted in the win/loss/draw column.

Unofficial record

Record with the inclusion of newspaper decisions in the win/loss/draw column.

See also
List of light heavyweight boxing champions

Notes

References

External links
 
 Mike McTigue Website
Mike McTigue - CBZ Profile

https://titlehistories.com/boxing/wba/wba-world-lh.html
https://titlehistories.com/boxing/na/usa/ny/nysac-lh.html

1892 births
1966 deaths
20th-century Irish people
Irish emigrants to the United States (before 1923)
Light-heavyweight boxers
Irish male boxers
Sportspeople from County Clare